Giampaolo Menichelli (born 29 June 1938) is a former Italian footballer, who played as a winger. Menichelli was a fast, agile winger, with good technical ability, and he was known for mainly being a team player, despite also having an eye for goal. His brother Franco was an Olympic champion in gymnastics.

Club career
Menichelli played for 12 seasons (261 games, 60 goals) in the Serie A for A.S. Roma, A.C. Parma, Juventus F.C., Brescia Calcio and Cagliari Calcio. Whilst at Roma, he formed a notable partnership with fellow winger Alberto Orlando, winning the 1960–61 Inter-Cities Fairs Cup. With Juventus he won the Coppa Italia over Herrera's "Grande Inter" during the 1964–65 season, finishing the competition as top scorer, with 3 goals, also reaching the final of the 1964–65 Inter-Cities Fairs Cup, only to lose 1–0 to Ferencváros in Turin. He also won the 1966–67 Serie A title during his six seasons in Turin, scoring an impressive 11 goals in 33 appearances during the league winning season.

International career
Menichelli also represented the Italy national football team during the 1960s; in total, he earned 9 caps for Italy between 1962 and 1964, scoring a single goal for Italy in a 3–1 away win against Belgium on 13 May 1962. He participated in the 1962 FIFA World Cup with Italy, making two appearances against Germany and Chile as Italy were rather disappointingly eliminated in the group stage.

Honours

Club
Juventus
Serie A: 1966–67
Coppa Italia: 1964–65

Roma
Inter-Cities Fairs Cup: 1960–61

Individual
Coppa Italia Top Goal Scorer: 1964–65

References

External links
 

1938 births
Living people
Italian footballers
Italy international footballers
1962 FIFA World Cup players
A.S. Roma players
A.S. Sambenedettese players
Parma Calcio 1913 players
Juventus F.C. players
Brescia Calcio players
Cagliari Calcio players
Serie A players
Serie B players
Footballers from Rome
Association football forwards